Walther von Hahn (born 26 April 1942 in Marburg/Lahn) is a German linguist and computer scientist and was until 2007 full professor both in Computer Science and Linguistics at the University of Hamburg.

Education and career 
Von Hahn studied German linguistics and literature, philosophy, and Latin and Protestant theology in Marburg/Lahn from 1962 to 1969. He received his PhD at the same university, with Prof. Dr. Ludwig Erich Schmitt. He moved to Hamburg University (Germany) and gave seminars in German linguistics. As a professor since 1978 his research and teaching shifted to more formal fields in the German seminar thereat. In 1987 he was appointed to full professor in the computer science department. Since then he kept the right of teaching in both departments. He was founder of the “Natural Language Systems Division” (NatS).

Research

Research fields 
 Computational Linguistics: morphology, lexicography,
 Artificial Intelligence: knowledge representation, machine (aided) translation
 Digital Humanities : data-modelling, vagueness and uncertainty representation in DH
 Specialized Language Communication

Major research projects 

Following the lines of technical language research von Hahn established (within German linguistics) the “HAM-RPM” project group (funding: German Science Foundation) and the Artificial Intelligence-centered group HAM-ANS (funding: Ministry of research and technology), which have been very influential in the German linguistic and AI community. As member of CS department he initiated and managed a national preparatory project for speech-to-speech machine translation with broad industrial and academic cooperation and participated in the international follow-up research project VERBMOBIL

From 1992-1998  von Hahn led the project DB(R)-MAT the first major machine aided  translation project involving languages in Central-Eastern Europe (Romanian and Bulgarian). The project based on  an innovative paradigm of linking multilingual lexical material onto a language independent ontology. In this way concepts were separated from their linguistic realization. This principle was applied in a European follow-up project "Language Technology foe eLearning" (LT4eL), in which he was involved (2005-2008)

From 2001 to 2003 he was the first director of the interdisciplinary group "Computerphioogie" at the University of Hamburg, one of the first initiatives in Digital Humanities in Germany and initiated the first curriculum in this domain in Germany.

He is one of the main contributors to the development of computational linguistics and Digital Humanities at the University of Bucharest and constant promoter of the cooperation between the University of Hamburg and St-Kliment Ohrdiski University of Sofia, University of Bucharest and Charles-University Prague

Since 2015 his research is focused on computer modelling and representation of vagueness in digital humanities.

Awards and honors 
 1984 the SEL research award “Technical Communication”
 1998 the Jubilee Medal of the Charles University Prague, Prague Czech Republic
 2002 Professor honors causa  of the University "Alexandru Ioan Cuza" Iași, Romania
 2012 Professor honors causa  of the University of Bucharest,  Bucharest, Romania

Selected publications 
 Walther v. Hahn and Cristina Vertan, "Vagueness-the neglected feature in big data", in Big Data in Social Sciences and Humanities, edited by CEFREEA -Bucharest
Alptug Güney and Cristina Vertan and Walther v. Hahn, “Combining hermeneutic and computer based methods for investigating reliability of historical texts”, Proceedings of the “Twin Talks” workshop collocated with DHN 2019, Steven Krauver and Darja Fiser (Eds), University of Copehnagen 2018, 
Cristina Vertan and Walther v. Hahn, Making historical texts accessible to everybody, in Proceedings of Language Technology for Text Simplification, Workshop associated with Coling 2014, Orasan, Ct. and Osenova P and Vertan, C. (Eds.) Dublin 2014, pp. 64-70,  6
Cristina Vertan and Walther v. Hahn, Discovering and Explaining Knowledge in Historical Documents, in: Kristin Bjnadottir, Stewen Krauwer, Cristina Vertan and Martin Wyne (Eds.), Proceedings of the Workshop on “Language Technology for Historical Languages and Newspaper Archives” associated with LREC 2014, Reykjavik Mai 2014, pp. 76-80, 
Melania Duma and  Mirela Duma and Walther v. Hahn and Cristina Vertan, Translation Technology for terminology in higher education, in Proceedings of the 19th European Symposium of Language for Special Purposes, Gerhard Budin and Vesna Lušicky (Eds.) Vienna, Austria, July 2014, pp. 220-227, 
Walther v. Hahn,  Cristina Vertan (Eds.): Specialised Languages in Global Commpunication. Frankfurt, (Proceedings der LSP 2008). Peter Lang 2010, 
 Walther v. Hahn, Monica Gavrila,  Cristina Vertan, Same Domain, Different Discourse Style. A Case Study on Language Resources for Data-driven Machine Translation, in: Proceedings of the Eighth International Conference on Language Resources and Evaluation (LREC'12). ,21-27.May 2012, Istanbul, Turkey.
 Walther v. Hahn, Monica Gavrila and Cristina Vertan, ProLiV – Learning Terminology with Animated Models for Visualizing Complex Linguistic Theories, in „Specialised Languages in Global Commpunication“, v. Hahn,W. and Vertan, C. (Eds.), Peter Lang 2010.
 Walther v. Hahn, Cristina Vertan, Challenges for the Multilingual Semantic Web, in Proceedings of the International MT Summit X 2005, Phuket, Thailand.
 Walther v. Hahn, Cristina Vertan, Specification and Evaluation of Machine Translation Toy Systems - Criteria for Laboratory Assignment,. in Proceedings of MT Summit IX Workshop on Teaching Translation Technologies and Tools, New Orleans, USA, 
 Walther v. Hahn, Putting together the Parts: Complex Artificial Intelligence Systems, in: Proceedings of Eighth Ireland Conference on AI (AI-97) Volume 2. Londonderry 1997 
 Walther v. Hahn, Galia Angelova, Combining Terminology, Lexical Semantics and Knowledge Representation in Machine Aided Translatio,. in: Christian Galinski & Klaus-Dirk Schmitz (eds.) TKE'96, Terminology and Knowledge Engineering. Frankfurt1996. 
 Walther v. Hahn, The Project Verbmobil. Mobile speech-to-speech translation, in Proceedings IJCAI Chambéry 1993
 Walther v. Hahn, Architectures as a Key Issue for Speech Understanding. in: E.Klein and F.Veltman (eds.): Natural Language and Speech. ESPRIT Symposium Procs Brussels November, 1991
 Walther v. Hahn, Hands-on Training and Language Engineering. In: Colloque "Problematique 1995" Salon International des Industries de la Langue. Actes des Conferences. Paris: OFIL 1991
 Walther v. Hahn, Three Ways of Cognitive Modelling in Knowledge Based Language Processing. In: Aplikace Umlé Intelligence AI´91. Prag 1991
 Walther v. Hahn, The Natural Language System Ham-ANS. In: Shapiro (Ed.) Encyclopedia of AI. 2. Edition 1991
 Walther v. Hahn,  Artificial Intelligence and Natural Language Understanding, in: Proceedings Symposium "Les Etats Generaux des Langues" Paris 1990.
 Walther v. Hahn, The Paradigms of Natural Language Dialogue Research in AI, in: Proceedings of the ATR Conference Kyoto1989
 Walther v. Hahn, LSP and Computer Application: New Fields of Activity for LSP-Research and Development, in: Chr. Laurén und M. Nordmann, Special Language: From Human Thinking to Thinking Machines. Philadelphia 1989. 
 Walther v. Hahn, Transparence and User-friendliness of Expert Systems, in: Th. Bernold and Hillenkamp (Eds.), Expert Systems in Production and Services. Amsterdam 1988. 
 Walther v. Hahn, LOKI - A Logic Oriented Approach to Knowledge and Data Bases Supporting a Natural User Interaction, in: W. Brauer und W. Wahlster (Ed.), Wissensbasierte Systeme. Proceedings 2. Internationaler GI-Kongress. München 1987. 
 Walther v. Hahn, Pragmatic Considerations in Man-Machine Discourse. Invited Lecture, in Proceedings  11th International Conference on Computational Linguistics. Bonn 1986
 Walther v. Hahn, Wolfgang Hoeppner and Wolfgng Wahlster, Das natürlich-sprachliche Dialog-Simulationssystem HAM-RPM. Dokumentation der Projektunterlagen. 2720 pages. Regensburg 1985. (Microfiche-Edition)
 Walther v. Hahn, Künstliche Intelligenz. Stuttgart 1985.
 Walther v. Hahn, Coerenza nel dialogo in sistemi di intelligenza artificiale per l´ analisi del linguaggio naturale, in: Ricerche di Psicologia 25 (1983) Milano. 
 Walther v. Hahn, Fachkommunikation. Entwicklung, linguistische Konzepte, betriebliche Beispiele. Berlin 1983
 Walther v. Hahn, Computational Linguistics. AILA - Review. 1981.
 Walther v. Hahn, Wolfgang Hoeppner, Anthony Jameson and Wolfgang Wahlster, The Anatomy of the Natural Language Dialogue System HAM-RPM. in: Bolc, L. (Ed.): Natural Language Based Computer Systems. München 1979. 
 Walther v. Hahn,  Anthony Jameson and Wolfgang Hoeppner and Wolfgang Wahlster: HAM-RPM: Natural Dialogues with an Artificial Partner, in: Proceedings of the AISB/GI Conference Hamburg 1978. 
 Walther v. Hahn, Report on the HAM-Group, in: ALLC-Bulletin 5 (1977.
 Walther v. Hahn, Die Fachsprache der Textilindustrie im 17. und 18. Jahrhundert. Düsseldorf 1971.

References

External links 
Walther v. Hahn's web site -Department of Computer Science, University of Hamburg
Walther v. Hahn's web site - Institute for German Language and Literature -University of Hamburg

1942 births
Germanists
German computer scientists
Academic staff of the University of Hamburg
Living people